A lottery is a form of gambling where players bet receipts are known as "tickets".

Lottery ticket may also refer to:

 Lottery Ticket (1970 film), an Indian film
 Lottery Ticket (2010 film), a US film
 The Lottery Ticket, an 1886 Jules Verne adventure novel

See also
 Mystery P.I.: The Lottery Ticket, a hidden object game
 The Lottery Ticket Seller, a 1953 Mexican film